Wu Wei (born 5 February 1997) is a Chinese footballer who currently plays for Chinese Super League side Dalian Professional.

Club career
Wu Wei was promoted to Hangzhou Greentown's first team squad in the summer of 2015, however he would have to wait until 12 March 2017 before he made his senior debut in a 3–2 home win against Nei Mongol Zhongyou in a league game. He would play in 16 league matches for the club at the end of the 2017 league season and would attract the interests of Chinese Super League side Tianjin Quanjian whom he transferred to on 28 February 2018. On 28 April 2018, he made his debut for the club in a 2–0 home loss to Hebei China Fortune, coming on as a substitute for Wang Yongpo in the 81st minute. 

On 7 February 2020 Wu Wei joined fellow top tier club Dalian Professional along with Tong Lei on the same day. He would make his debut in a league game against Shandong Taishan F.C. on 26 July 2020 in a 3-2 defeat. The following season he would go on to score his first goal for the club in a Chinese FA Cup game on 18 October 2021, against Tianjin Jinmen Tiger F.C. in a 2-0 victory.

Career statistics
.

References

External links
 

1997 births
Living people
Chinese footballers
People from Xinxiang
Footballers from Henan
Zhejiang Professional F.C. players
Tianjin Tianhai F.C. players
Dalian Professional F.C. players
Chinese Super League players
China League One players
Association football midfielders